Metropolitan Police Sports Club Ground is a cricket ground in East Molesey, Surrey.  The first recorded match on the ground was in 1940, when the Metropolitan Police played a British Empire XI.

In 2003, Surrey used the ground for 2 Twenty20 matches in the 2003 Twenty20 Cup, played against Essex and Sussex.

Being based at a police training college, the ground is used by a number of police teams.  A well maintained ground, the cricket pavilion was constructed in 1983.

Other Metropolitan Police Sports Club Grounds
The Metropolitan Police have other sports clubs at Bushey, Chigwell, and Hayes.

References

External links
Metropolitan Police Sports Club Ground on CricketArchive
Metropolitan Police Sports Club Ground on Cricinfo

Cricket grounds in Surrey
Metropolitan Police
Surrey County Cricket Club grounds
Borough of Elmbridge
Sports venues completed in 1940